The Last Run is a 1971 American action film shot in Portugal, Málaga and elsewhere in Spain directed by Richard Fleischer, starring George C. Scott, Tony Musante, Trish Van Devere, and Colleen Dewhurst.

Plot
Harry Garmes (George C. Scott) is an aging American career criminal who was once a driver for Chicago's organized crime rings. He is living in self-imposed exile in Albufeira, a fishing village in southern Portugal, where he owns a fishing boat and seeks occasional companionship from Monique (Colleen Dewhurst), a local prostitute, as his wife has left him after the untimely death of their son.

Unexpectedly, Harry receives a job, his first in nine years, to drive an escaped killer Paul Rickard (Tony Musante) and the man's girlfriend Claudie Scherrer (Trish Van Devere) across Portugal and Spain into France. Rickard was imprisoned in Spain for an unrelated crime, but he originally had been hired to assassinate the French President DeGaulle by the OAS, which failed; it appears that the OAS is attempting another hit, and has arranged his escape and transport.  Without knowing this, Garmes accepts the job as a chance to prove to himself that he can still make the grade, despite premonitions that it will end badly for him as he gives Monique money to hold, which she may keep if he doesn't come back.

In the course of the trip, made in a BMW 503 modified with a hidden smuggling compartment and supercharger, Harry and his passengers are pursued by both the Spanish police and the French Security Service, who in fact arranged the escape to eliminate Rickard. Upon returning to Portugal, and apparently having been betrayed by Monique, Harry gets shot on the beach in Albufeira, moments away from escaping on his boat with Rickard and Scherrer.

Cast
 George C. Scott as Harry Garmes
 Tony Musante as Paul Rickard
 Trish Van Devere as Claudie Scherrer
 Colleen Dewhurst as Monique
 Aldo Sambrell as Miguel

Production history
The film was based on an original script by Alan Sharp who called it "an attempt to use the melodramatic crime chase to deal with whatever the hero's preoccupations might be."

In July 1970, MGM-British announced they would be making a production and distribution deal with EMI creating a new company, MGM-EMI, and would produce four films: The Go-Between, The Boyfriend, Get Carter and The Last Run. By that stage the film was going to be directed by John Boorman. Boorman eventually left the project because he was unhappy with the script.

George C. Scott agreed to play the lead role. He was at the height of his career due to the success of Patton and did The Last Run because "for the longest time I've been looking for a Bogart-like meaty part. I haven't found it til now."

Scott called the movie "an old fashioned adventure picture. It's kind of a Bogart part - the lonely, separated man trying to make a comeback. It's the sort of thing that people can enjoy."

John Huston
In November 1970, MGM head of production Herbert F. Solow announced the film would be made as part of a ten picture slate from the studio over the next six months - the other films were The Wild Rovers, Fortune and Men's Eyes, Shaft, Sextette (ultimately not made for some years), Travels with My Aunt, The Gang That Couldn't Shoot Straight, Bullet Proof and The Gazebo. By now the director of The Last Run was John Huston. He and Scott previously worked together on The List of Adrian Messenger and The Bible: In the Beginning.

Huston later said "I didn't like the script that was given to me" but he still agreed to make it. "I should never have got into it."

His cinematographer was Sven Nykvist, who regularly collaborated with Ingmar Bergman and was making his first American movie. Nykvist later recalled he felt "very insecure" during the shoot "because, instead of the 18 technicians I was used to working with, I had about 100. I saw that everyone was sitting around most of the time. Someone told me that I was the man who should make them work, but I couldn't do that because I was so shy. So I talked to myself that evening and I said: "You have to remember what Ingmar said when we started our first picture-the only thing that's important is what shows on the screen. "

Key roles were given to Tina Aumont and Tony Musante.

Filming began January 3, 1971. Scott and Huston had fights on the set, in part because Huston and his son Tony were rewriting the script constantly. Matters were complicated by Scott's drinking. His wife Colleen Dewhurst flew out to the location with his two children; Dewhurst wound up playing the heart-of-gold-hooker who has a small but important scene with Scott in the first act.

Huston said he thought he could change the script "and make it something acceptable. The possibilities of the story appealed to me. What was done in black and white didn't appeal to me very much, but I saw an opportunity to do something with it, changes which would be acceptable and interesting."

Alan Sharp later said he rewrote the script six times. "I'm not one of those guys who feels 'It's my masterpiece, no one must touch it'," he said. "If they want to make changes let them make changes. In the final analysis, it's got to be their picture anyway. What gets me is when they come to me and say 'I don't know what it is I want but that isn't it. Give me something else'."

Sharp said Huston, Huston's assistant Gladys Hill, and son Tony "played around" with the script "until they've got it all screwed up - no characterization, no motivation, no nothing" and said Scott was frustrated because He "wanted to do the original script."

Huston said "Scott wanted to do something nostalgic which would bring to mind the old Bogart films... I didn't agree. It just proved that I should never have got into it in the first place."

By February Huston had walked off the production. French-American actress Tina Aumont, who was originally cast as the killer’s girlfriend, also quit the film. "She couldn't act," claimed Sharp who said Huston rewrote the script in part to create a new character for her "so she could get through it somehow without having to act."

"It was a very simple story of an artistic disagreement," said Scott. "John saw it one way. Carter and I another. I love Huston, I want to work with him again. He is a giant in our industry."

Richard Fleischer
Production was shut down for a week. MGM head of European operations Robert Littman flew out to the set. Jim Aubrey, head of MGM, wanted to abandon filming but Littman persuaded him to continue.

Littman called Richard Fleischer, who had just finished directing Mia Farrow in See No Evil. Fleischer turned down the job, disliking the script. He was persuaded to visit the unit, where he met with the producer, star and writer. He got Sharp to tell him the story they were making, and said that was not the story in the script. Fleischer read the original draft and felt "all the important parts" had been cut out.

Finding a replacement for Aumont was more difficult. Scott wanted Bonnie Bedelia who had just finished a movie in Spain but she turned down the part. Eventually the role went to Trish Van Devere, an American actress who had just made her film debut in Where's Poppa?.

Scott and Van Devere fell in love during the production once Dewhurst left the unit. Dewhurst and Scott divorced after the production concluded, and the actor married Van Devere. "What happened in the film, happened in life," said Fleischer. "That's nature imitating art."

The film finished with a cost of a little over $2 million, being only one week and $30,000 over the original schedule.

"I think it's a miracle it got made," said Fleischer. "I'm the miracle."

Release
Metro-Goldwyn-Mayer promoted the film with the tag line: "In the tradition of Hemingway and Bogart."

Critical response
The Last Run was poorly received by critics, and most of them lamented the replacement of Huston with Fleischer.  Roger Ebert, writing for the Chicago Sun-Times, commented that "with Huston directing Alan Sharp's interesting screenplay, the movie would still have had the good stuff, I think, and would have avoided the embarrassing collapses of tone that wreck this version."

Roger Greenspun, reviewing the film for The New York Times, stated that Fleischer "a veteran of more than 20 years in the business...seems not yet to have mastered the reaction shot; and his automobile chase sequences, for all the billowing dust and squealing tires, seem to move at 30 miles an hour."

Toni Mastroianni, reviewing the film for the Cleveland Press, faulted Scott’s performance as the main stumbling block: "The problem with Scott at the moment is to find a movie as big as he is. The role is right for him and maybe he should play a real Hemingway part instead of an imitation one."

The Los Angeles Times called it "a satisfying film". Huston said the picture "had nothing to recommend it." On Rotten Tomatoes, the film has an aggregated score of 40% based on 2 positive and 3 negative reviews.

Box Office
The film was not a commercial success.

As of 2011, it has been available on DVD as a Warner Brothers Archive release.

See also
 The Transporter (2002)
 List of American films of 1971

Notes

References

External links 
 
 
 

1971 films
1971 action films
1971 crime films
1970s crime action films
American crime action films
American chase films
Films about automobiles
Films directed by Richard Fleischer
Films scored by Jerry Goldsmith
Metro-Goldwyn-Mayer films
Films shot in Almería
Films set in Spain
Films set in Portugal
1970s English-language films
1970s American films